Richard is a given name.

Richard may also refer to:

Richard (surname)

People
Richard, Count of Évreux (died 1067), a Norman aristocrat
Richard (first abbot of Fountains) (died 1139), an English Benedictine and Cistercian
Richard, Count of Molise (died c. 1170), a Norman nobleman
Richard, Count of Acerra (died 1196), an Italo-Norman nobleman
Richard (II), bishop of Bayeux (early 12th century), France
Richard (III), bishop of Bayeux (12th century), France
Richard (Dean of Armagh), early 13th century Dean of Armagh, Ireland
Richard (bishop of the Isles), late 13th century Bishop of the Isles, Scotland
Richard, 4th Prince of Sayn-Wittgenstein-Berleburg (1882–1925), in present-day Germany
Richard (footballer, born 1991), Richard de Oliveira Costa, Brazilian football goalkeeper
Richard (footballer, born 1994), Richard Candido Coelho, Brazilian football defensive midfielder
Richard (footballer, born 1999), Richard Alexandre Birkheun Rodrigues, Brazilian football winger
Richard (footballer, born 2003)

Places
Richard, Saskatchewan, Canada
Richard, Iowa, United States
Richard, West Virginia, United States
Richard I and II, underground factories at Leitmeritz concentration camp

Other uses
Hurricane Richard, in 2010
Richard (film), a 1972 lampoon of U.S. President Richard Nixon

See also
 Rick (disambiguation)
 Ricard, a surname